John Nanfan (died ) was a 17th-century English politician, elected MP for Worcestershire in 1656.

Nanfan was the oldest son of William Nanfan of Birtsmorton, Worcestershire.

He married Mary, daughter of Edward Fleet alias Walsgrave of Worcester. Their son was Bridges Nanfan .

He was appointed an Assessment Commissioner for Worcestershire in 1656, and a JP in 1660.

Nanfan was elected MP for Worcestershire in 1656, but Oliver Cromwell would not let him take his seat. He stood unsuccessfully for Worcestershire in 1659, and for the city of Worcester in 1661.

He died around 1677.

References

 

English MPs 1656–1658
English justices of the peace
Members of the Parliament of England for Worcestershire